Antonio Ottone (1941 - 2002) was an Argentine film director, screenwriter and film producer. He presided over the National Institute of Cinematography (1994-1995).

Filmography
 Flores robadas en los jardines de Quilmes (1985)
 Los amores de Laurita (1986)
 Pequeños sinvergüenzas (1990)
 Un Elefante en banda (1990)
 Casi no nos dimos cuenta (1990)
 La Garganta del diablo (1991)
 Un Amor en Moisés Ville (2001)

External links
 

1941 births
2002 deaths
People from Santa Fe, Argentina
Deaths from pancreatic cancer
Argentine film directors
Argentine film producers
Male screenwriters
Deaths from cancer in Argentina
20th-century Argentine screenwriters
20th-century Argentine male writers